The 2015 Brighton and Hove City Council election took place on 7 May 2015 to elect members of Brighton and Hove City Council in England. This is on the same day as the general election and other local elections.

The election saw the Green party lose their minority control of the council. The party had gained control of the council from the Conservative Party following the previous election, with the party elected on a promise to resist cuts from central government. During the administration however the council was faced with cuts of up to £80 million.

Other issues faced by the party included internal disputes, which had seen several attempts to remove Green party leader (and leader of Brighton & Hove Council), Jason Kitcat. In one prominent incident the Green administration faced a strike by the city's binmen, following changes to their allowances. The strike, undertaken during the summer, saw refuse go uncollected. The Green administration split over the strike, with several Green councillors (alongside Brighton Pavilion MP Caroline Lucas), including Kitcat's deputy, siding with the binmen.

Following the election, the Labour Party formed a minority administration to run the council.

Results of election

|}

Ward breakdown

Brunswick and Adelaide

Central Hove

East Brighton

Goldsmid

Hangleton and Knoll

Hanover and Elm Grove

Hollingdean and Stanmer

Hove Park

Moulsecoomb and Bevendean

North Portslade

Patcham

Preston Park

Queen's Park

Regency

Rottingdean Coastal

South Portslade

St Peter's and North Laine

Westbourne

Wish

Withdean

Woodingdean

External links
Results on council website
Results from The Argus Live Blog

References

2015 English local elections
May 2015 events in the United Kingdom
2015
2010s in East Sussex